Apertochrysa arcuata is a species of green lacewing.

See also
 Apertochrysa flavinotala
 Apertochrysa pilinota

References

Chrysopidae
Insects described in 2004